The Ulster Schools' Challenge Cup is an annual competition involving schools affiliated to the Ulster Branch of the Irish Rugby Football Union. The Schools' Cup has the distinction of being the world's second-oldest rugby competition, having been competed for every year since 1876. The trophy itself is a three-handled silver cup with a plinth mounted on a large shield.

Methodist College Belfast have won the most titles with 39 wins – 37 outright wins and 2 shared.

Format 

The Schools' Cup was reformatted in 2003/04. Previously teams defeated in the first round would enter the Subsidiary Shield competition, teams losing in later rounds would find their season over. All entrants, except those who drew byes, entered in the first round of the competition. It was felt that this could lead to significant mismatches. The reformatting sought to avoid this and to extend the amount of meaningful rugby played by school teams.

The first round was changed to act as a qualifying stage for weaker teams and first round losers entered a new Schools' Trophy competition.

The bulk of the teams entered the competition in the second round where they were joined by the first-round qualifiers. Teams losing at this stage are entered into another new competition, the Schools' Bowl.

In the third round, four seeded teams entered the fray. Third-round losers entered the Subsidiary Shield, renamed the Schools' Shield. The Subsidiary Shield was first introduced in 1971. It did not have its own trophy until 1980 when the Headmaster of Grosvenor High School and then Ulster Branch President Ken Reid presented the Grosvenor Shield.

The remaining teams contest for the Schools' Cup proper, the semi-finals and final of which are played at Ravenhill Stadium, the Ulster Branch HQ and home of the Ulster side.

The competition format was changed again in 2005/06. The first round was a round-robin competition involving three teams. The winner from this joined eleven other teams in the second round. The six winners from the second round joined ten more teams in the third round; the second round losers competed for the Schools' Trophy.

The eight third-round winners proceeded to the fourth round where they were joined by eight seeded teams. The third-round losers competed for the Schools' Bowl. The fourth round proceeded as per the old third round.

The increased number of competitions means that schools which are very unlikely to win the main competition have more competitive rugby and an opportunity to win a trophy.

History 

The first winners in 1876 were the Royal School, Armagh. When the Cup no longer had room to record the winners on it, the Cup was mounted on a wooden shield to which plaques were attached. In the centenary year of the competition after the 1976 final, the governors of Methodist College presented a new shield, as the original had no more room to record the winners. The Royal School won in 1977, thus claiming the place at the top of the new shield. The first wooden shield is on exhibit at the Ulster Branch offices at Ravenhill Stadium.

The first final to be played at Ravenhill was in 1924. Before that, finals were played at the Royal Ulster Agricultural Society grounds at Balmoral, the Ulster Sports Club grounds at Cross Parade in Belfast, and one final was played at the Linfield Football Club ground at Windsor Park.

A total of seventeen schools have won the trophy at least once.

The St. Patrick's Day final is televised live on BBC Northern Ireland.

List of finals
Note: Prior to 1942 drawn finals were always replayed. In 1942 it was decided if the final was drawn, a replay would only take place if both schools agreed. It has since become the rule that replays are never held and the trophy is automatically shared. Shares occurred in 1942, 1953, 1954, 1960, 1962, 1963, 1964 & 1996.

Key

Points values

The values for scores in rugby union have changed throughout the history of the competition. This table summarises them.

Records 
Most consecutive wins: 7, Royal Belfast Academical Institution 1942-48
Greatest winning margin in final: 54 points, 1998:  Royal Belfast Academical Institution 57-3 Coleraine Academical Institution
Highest aggregate score in final: 62 points, 2019: Methodist College Belfast 45-17 Campbell College

Results by school
Information as provided by Schools' Cup Final programme (various years)

Subsidiary competitions

The Grosvenor Shield

Subsidiary Shield 1971–2003, Schools' Shield 2004–

Schools' Bowl

Schools' Trophy

(*) - Cambridge House fielded an ineligible player in the final: the Trophy was awarded to Portadown College.

See also 
 Ulster Rugby
 Medallion Shield
 Connacht Schools Senior Cup
 Leinster Schools Senior Cup
 Munster Schools Senior Cup
 Ireland national schoolboy rugby union team
 List of oldest rugby union competitions

Sources

External links 
 Past winners of Ulster Schools' Cup BBC Sport, 14 March 2003
 Ulster Rugby

High school rugby union competitions in Ireland
Rugby union competitions in Ulster
1876 establishments in Ireland
Recurring sporting events established in 1876